James Anderson (born 23 November 1998) better known as Jvck James, is a British singer and songwriter from London, England. After gaining some attraction in his younger days posting viral videos on YouTube , his anticipated first single release in 2017 was met with a breakout performance for COLORS Studio. James signed a recording deal with RCA Records UK (2020-2022). A standout single "No Drama" off of his 2021 release "JOYRIDE" was listed in Complex Uk's "Best Songs of 2021". After the release of his third EP "ON THE ROCKS"  this year, he was recently announced as Apple Music's Global Up Next Artist for 2022.

Early life

1998-2017: Childhood 
James Anderson was born and raised in East London, the youngest of his siblings. Brought up in a religious Jamaican family, he was exposed to gospel and reggae music from an early age which lead him to discover his love for R&B. Brandy, Destiny's Child, Michael Jackson and Kirk Franklin became James' childhood heroes, he was soon to discover D’Angelo, Erykah Badu & Lauryn Hill. Starting young singing at his grandmothers Pentecostal church he began to gain traction showing his talents on YouTube. His biggest cover was a tribute to the legend Whitney Houston singing "I Have Nothing". In 2012, uploads of James’ covers eventually lead to him a role in the West End playing as young MJ for two years  in the Thriller Live musical from just the age of twelve. After graduating from the BRIT School in 2015 and moving on to college ELAM (the East London Arts and Music college) (2015-2017) the JVCK JAMES moniker was born and stuck.

2017-present: Career 
Whilst still at college he released his first single "Extroverted Lovers" which met with a breakout performance for COLORS live session in 2017. That, in turn, gathered even more pace, picking up more views, including Mahalia and Ella Mai who both invited him on tour with them across Europe and America. Following his debut project release "DETOUR" in 2019, James began his partnership with UK record label RCA in 2020. Later that year, he performed at the BET Soul Train Awards. Pre-Show and featured in their viral UK Soul Cypher

The following year JVCK JAMES released his second EP JOYRIDE, and described the collection of work as "R&B on steroids". Featuring 6 tracks including the singles ‘No Drama’ and ‘Joyride (ándale)’ the EP launched with a fully formed visual JOYRIDE (Short Film), which was created in conjunction of director Fenn O’Meally. The lead single "No Drama was featured on Complex Uk's "Best Songs of 2021"

Now in 2022 "Hennessy Tears" is one of the highlights from JVCK JAMES’ most recent EP, On The Rocks, which was released back in April. The release was accompanied with a recent co-sign from Apple Music who announced JVCK as one of their Global Up Next Artist's for 2022.

Discography

Extended Plays

Singles

As lead artist

References

External links 
 Official website

1998 births
Living people
English singer-songwriters
Musicians from London
RCA Records artists
English people of Jamaican descent